USS Geronimo may refer to the following ships of the United States Navy:

 a district harbor tug commissioned in 1933 and struck in 1946
 a  built in 1944 and transferred to Taiwan in 1968, renamed ROCS Chiu Lien (AGS-563)

United States Navy ship names